Marc Weissbluth is an American pediatrician who has written several books on infant sleep. He is a sleep disorders specialist at the Children's Memorial Hospital in Chicago.

Education and early research 
Weissbluth was born in Brooklyn, New York and graduated from Palo Alto High School in California. He received his B.A. from Stanford University with Department of Biology Science Honors in 1965.  Weissbluth graduated from Washington University in St. Louis School of Medicine and was Chief Resident at St. Louis Children’s Hospital.

Career
From 1973 to 1978 Weissbluth practiced solo general pediatrics in Chicago’s Chinatown.  In 1978, he joined the full-time faculty at Children’s Memorial Hospital, and did research on sleep in children in the Sleep Disorders Clinic that he founded. In 1983, he returned to private practice and founded The Northwestern Children's Practice.

He conducted research in children’s sleep and discovered associations between infant colic and infant sleep and separately, between temperament in children and children’s sleep.  His research also showed that moving the bedtime earlier significantly reduces the frequency of night awakenings in a child. In the Sleep Disorders Clinic, he developed a program consisting of several separate elements to help parents solve their child’s sleep problems.  He called this program "sleep training", a term he introduced in Healthy Sleep Habits, Healthy Child.  Subsequently, this term has been popularized as shorthand for a specific sleep solution called ‘extinction’.

Publications
 Crybabies
 Sweet Baby: How to Soothe Your Newborn
 Your Fussy Baby
 Healthy Sleep Habits, Happy Child
 Healthy Sleep Habits, Happy Twins

References

American pediatricians
Washington University School of Medicine alumni
Living people
Northwestern University faculty
Year of birth missing (living people)
American family and parenting writers
Washington University in St. Louis alumni
20th-century American writers